This is a listing of the horses that finished in either first, second, or third place and the number of starters in the Maryland Million Turf Sprint Handicap, an American state-bred stakes race for horses three years old and older at five and a half furlongs on the turf held at Laurel Park Racecourse in Laurel, Maryland.  (List 2004-present)

See also 

 Maryland Million Turf Sprint Handicap
 Maryland Million Day
 Laurel Park Racecourse

References

 Maryland Thoroughbred official website

Horse races in Maryland
Recurring events established in 2004
Laurel Park Racecourse
Recurring sporting events established in 2004